Komoni is a village on the island of Anjouan in the Comoros. According to the 1991 census the village had a population of 2,287. The calculation for 2012 is 4,376 people

References

Populated places in Anjouan